Sameer Rizvi (born 6 December 2003) is an Indian cricketer. He made his first-class debut on 27 January 2020, for Uttar Pradesh in the 2019–20 Ranji Trophy. He made his List A debut on 11 December 2021, for Uttar Pradesh in the 2021–22 Vijay Hazare Trophy.

References

External links
 

2003 births
Living people
Indian cricketers
Uttar Pradesh cricketers
Place of birth missing (living people)